The Cuyahoga Formation is a geologic formation in Ohio. The age of the formation is difficult to determine, because of a lack of diagnostic fossils. Roughly, the formation dates from the Late Kinderhookian (354.8 to 350.8 million years ago) to the Middle Osagean (347.7 to 344.5 million years ago). Eight members are recognized, among them the Orangeville Shale, Sharpsville Sandstone, and Meadville Shale.

It preserves fossils dating to the Mississippian subperiod of the Carboniferous period.

See also

 List of fossiliferous stratigraphic units in Ohio

References

Carboniferous Ohio
Carboniferous southern paleotemperate deposits
Carboniferous southern paleotropical deposits
Mississippian United States